The Cape Colony was a Dutch United East India Company (VOC) colony in Southern Africa, centered on the Cape of Good Hope, from where it derived its name. The original colony and its successive states that the colony was incorporated into occupied much of modern South Africa. Between 1652 and 1691 it was a Commandment, and between 1691 and 1795 a Governorate of the United East India Company (VOC). Jan van Riebeeck established the colony as a re-supply and layover port for vessels of the VOC trading with Asia. The Cape came under VOC rule from 1652 to 1795 and from 1803 to 1806 was ruled by the Batavian Republic. Much to the dismay of the shareholders of the VOC, who focused primarily on making profits from the Asian trade, the colony rapidly expanded into a settler colony in the years after its founding.

As the only permanent settlement of the Dutch United East India Company not serving as a trading post, it proved an ideal retirement place for employees of the company. After several years of service in the company, an employee could lease a piece of land in the colony as a Vryburgher ('free citizen'), on which he had to cultivate crops that he had to sell to the United East India Company for a fixed price. As these farms were labour-intensive, Vryburghers imported slaves from Madagascar, Mozambique and Asia (Dutch East Indies and Dutch Ceylon), which rapidly increased the number of inhabitants. After King Louis XIV of France revoked the Edict of Nantes (October 1685), which had protected the right of Huguenots in France to practise Protestant worship without persecution from the state, the colony attracted many Huguenot settlers, who eventually mixed with the general Vryburgher population.

Due to the authoritarian rule of the company (telling farmers what to grow for what price, controlling immigration, and monopolising trade), some farmers tried to escape the rule of the company by moving further inland. The company, in an effort to control these migrants, established a magistracy at Swellendam in 1745 and another at Graaff Reinet in 1786, and declared the Gamtoos River as the eastern frontier of the colony, only to see the Trekboers cross it soon afterwards. In order to avoid collision with the Bantu peoples advancing south and west from east central Africa, the VOC agreed in 1780 to make the Great Fish River the boundary of the colony.

In 1795, after the Battle of Muizenberg in present-day Cape Town, the British occupied the colony. Under the terms of the Peace of Amiens of 1802, Britain acceded the colony to the Dutch on 1 March 1803, but as the Batavian Republic had since nationalized the United East India Company (1796), the colony came under the direct rule of The Hague. Dutch control did not last long, however, as the outbreak of the Napoleonic Wars (18 May 1803) invalidated the Peace of Amiens. In January 1806, the British occupied the colony for a second time after the Battle of Blaauwberg at present-day Bloubergstrand. The Anglo-Dutch Treaty of 1814 confirmed the transfer of sovereignty to Great Britain.

History

United East India Company 

Traders of the United East India Company (VOC), under the command of Jan van Riebeeck, were the first people to establish a European colony in South Africa. The Cape settlement was built by them in 1652 as a re-supply point and way-station for United East India Company vessels on their way back and forth between the Netherlands and Batavia (Jakarta) in the Dutch East Indies. The support station gradually became a settler community, the forebears of the Boers, and the Cape Dutch who collectively became modern-day Afrikaners.

Khoena and Sān of the Cape 

At the time of first European settlement in the Cape, the southwest of Africa was inhabited by Sān ("Foragers") and Khoi-Khoi people, the latter being primarily pastoral people with a population estimated between 13,000 and 15,000. The Khoena ("People") were disgruntled by the disruption of their seasonal visit to the area for which purpose they grazed their cattle at the foot of Table Mountain only to find European settlers occupying and farming the land, leading to the first Khoi-Dutch War as part of a series of Khoekhoe-Dutch Wars. After the war, the natives ceded the land to the settlers in 1660. During a visit in 1672, the high-ranking Commissioner Arnout van Overbeke made a formal purchase of the Cape territory, although already ceded in 1660, his reason was to "prevent future disputes".

The ability of the European settlers to produce food at the Cape initiated the decline of the nomadic lifestyle of the Khoe and !Ui speaking peoples since food was produced at a fixed location. Thus by 1672, the permanent indigenous residents living at the Cape had grown substantially. The first school to be built in South Africa by the settlers were for the sake of the slaves who had been rescued from a Portuguese slave ship and arrived at the Cape with the Amersfoort in 1658. Later on, the school was also attended by the children of the indigenes and the Free Burghers. The Dutch language was taught at schools as the main medium for commercial purposes, with the result that the indigenous people and even the French settlers found themselves speaking Dutch more than their native languages. The principles of Christianity were also introduced at the school resulting in the baptisms of many slaves and indigenous residents.

Conflicts with the settlers and the effects of smallpox decimated their numbers in 1713 and 1755, until gradually the breakdown of their society led them to work for the colonists, mostly as shepherds and herdsmen.

Free Burghers 

The VOC favoured the idea of freemen at the Cape and many settlers requested to be discharged in order to become free burghers; as a result, Jan van Riebeeck approved the notion on favorable conditions and earmarked two areas near the Liesbeek River for farming purposes in 1657. The two areas which were allocated to the freemen, for agricultural purposes, were named Groeneveld and Dutch Garden. These areas were separated by the Amstel River (Liesbeek River). Nine of the best applicants were selected to use the land for agricultural purposes. The freemen or free burghers as they were afterwards termed, thus became subjects, and were no longer servants, of the company.

Trekboers 

After the first settlers spread out around the Company station, nomadic European livestock farmers, or Trekboeren, moved more widely afield, leaving the richer, but limited, farming lands of the coast for the drier interior tableland. There they contested still wider groups of Khoe-speaking cattle herders for the best grazing lands.

The Cape society in this period was thus a diverse one. The emergence of Afrikaans reflects this diversity, from its roots as a Khoe-Dutch pidgin, to its subsequent creolisation and use as "Kitchen Dutch" by slaves and serfs of the colonials, and its later use in Cape Islam by them when it first became a written language that used the Arabic letters. By the time of British rule after 1795, the sociopolitical foundations were firmly laid.

British conquest

In 1795, France occupied the Dutch Republic. This prompted Great Britain, at war with France, to occupy the territory that same year as a way to better control the seas on the way to India. The British sent a fleet of nine warships which anchored at Simon's Town and, following the defeat of the Dutch militia at the Battle of Muizenberg, took control of the territory. The United East India Company transferred its territories and claims to the Batavian Republic (the Dutch sister republic established by France) in 1798, then ceased to exist in 1799. Improving relations between Britain and Napoleonic France, and its vassal state the Batavian Republic, led the British to hand the Cape Colony over to the Batavian Republic in 1803, under the terms of the Treaty of Amiens.

In 1806, the Cape, now nominally controlled by the Batavian Republic, was occupied again by the British after their victory in the Battle of Blaauwberg. The peace between Britain and Napoleonic France had broken after one year, while Napoleon had been strengthening his influence on the Batavian Republic (which he would replace with a monarchy later that year). The British established their colony to control the Far East trade routes. In 1814 the Dutch government formally ceded sovereignty over the Cape to the British, under the terms of the Convention of London.

Administrative divisions

The Dutch Cape Colony was divided into four districts. In 1797 their populations were:

Commanders and Governors of the Cape Colony (1652–1806)
The title of the founder of the Cape Colony, Jan van Riebeeck, was installed as "Commander of the Cape", a position he held from 1652 to 1662. During the tenure of Simon van der Stel, the colony was elevated to the rank of a governorate, hence he was promoted to the position of "Governor of the Cape".

References

Sources
 The Migrant Farmer in the History of the Cape Colony. P.J. Van Der Merwe, Roger B. Beck. Ohio University Press. 1 January 1995. 333 pages. .
 History of the Boers in South Africa; Or, the Wanderings and Wars of the Emigrant Farmers from Their Leaving the Cape Colony to the Acknowledgment of Their Independence by Great Britain. George McCall Theal. Greenwood Press. 28 February 1970. 392 pages. .
 Status and Respectability in the Cape Colony, 1750–1870: A Tragedy of Manners. Robert Ross, David Anderson. Cambridge University Press. 1 July 1999. 220 pages. .

 
History of South Africa
Former colonies in Africa
Former Dutch colonies
Former settlements and colonies of the Dutch East India Company
Dutch colonisation in Africa
History of the Dutch East India Company
17th century in South Africa
18th century in South Africa
19th century in South Africa
States and territories established in 1652
States and territories disestablished in 1806

1652 establishments in Africa
1806 disestablishments in Africa
1652 establishments in the Dutch Empire
1806 disestablishments in the Dutch Empire